The 2020–21 Holstein Kiel season was the club's 121st season in existence and the club's fourth consecutive season in the second flight of German football. In addition to the domestic league, Holstein Kiel participated in this season's edition of the DFB-Pokal. The season covered the period from 1 July 2020 to 30 June 2021.

Players

First-team squad

Out on loan

Transfers

In

Loans in

Out

Loans out

Pre-season and friendlies

Competitions

Overview

2. Bundesliga

League table

Results summary

Results by round

Matches
The league fixtures were announced on 7 August 2020.

Promotion play-offs
As a result of their third place finish in the regular season, the club qualified for the play-off match with the 16th-place team in the 2020–21 Bundesliga to determine whether the club would be promoted to the 2021–22 Bundesliga.

DFB-Pokal

Statistics

Appearances and goals

|-
! colspan=16 style=background:#dcdcdc; text-align:center| Goalkeepers

|-
! colspan=16 style=background:#dcdcdc; text-align:center| Defenders

|-
! colspan=16 style=background:#dcdcdc; text-align:center| Midfielders

|-
! colspan=16 style=background:#dcdcdc; text-align:center| Forwards

|-
! colspan=16 style=background:#dcdcdc; text-align:center| Players transferred out during the season

Goalscorers

Notes

References

External links

Holstein Kiel seasons
Holstein Kiel